Louis III (25 September 1403 – 12 November 1434) was a claimant to the Kingdom of Naples from 1417 to 1426, as well as count of Provence, Forcalquier, Piedmont, and Maine and duke of Anjou from 1417 to 1434. As the heir designate to the throne of Naples, he was duke of Calabria from 1426 to 1434.

Claim to Aragon
Louis was the eldest son and heir of Louis II of Anjou and Yolande of Aragon. The throne of the Crown of Aragon fell vacant in 1410 when Yolande's uncle King Martin died. As the daughter of King John I of Aragon, Martin's brother and predecessor, Yolande claimed the throne of Aragon for the young Louis. However, unclear though they were, the succession rules of the Kingdom of Aragon and the County of Barcelona at that time were understood to favor all male relatives before any female. Martin died without surviving issue in 1410, and after two years without a king, the Estates of Aragon by Compromise of Caspe in 1412 elected Martin's nephew Ferdinand of Castile as the next king of Aragon. Louis' family acquired some Aragonese lands in Montpellier and Roussillon.

Yolande and her sons regarded themselves as heirs of higher claim and began to call themselves king and queen of Sicily (including Naples), Jerusalem, Aragon, and Majorca. Of those, only the mainland part of Sicily was ever directly held by Louis, and only briefly. Louis also had claims on the title Latin Emperor, which his grandfather Louis I had purchased in 1383, but he never appears to have used this title.

Claim to Naples
Pope Martin V invested Louis III on 4 December 1419 as king of Sicily (Naples). This was in contrast with the will of the childless and aged queen of the Italian kingdom, Joanna II, who had adopted Alfonso V of Aragon as her heir. In 1420 Louis disembarked in Campania and besieged Naples, but had to flee at the arrival of an Aragonese fleet. Alfonso entered the city in 1421 and Louis lost the support of the Pope, tired by the costs of the war. However, when the relationships between Alfonso and the queen suddenly worsened after the arrest of Joanna's lover and prime minister, Gianni Caracciolo, the queen moved to Aversa where Louis joined her. He was adopted and named heir in lieu of Alfonso, giving him the title of duke of Calabria. When Alfonso had to return to Aragon, the kingdom was pacified. Louis moved to his feudal possession in Calabria, where he lived with his wife, Margaret of Savoy. They had no children.

Louis never became king effectively, as he died of malaria at Cosenza in 1434. His brother René succeeded Joanna upon her death the following year.

Notes

References

Sources
Amedeo Miceli di Serradileo, "Una dichiarazione di Luigi III d'Angiò dalla città di San Marco", Archivio Storico per la Calabria e la Lucania, Rome, XLIII,1976, pp. 69–83.

|-

|-

1403 births
1434 deaths
15th-century monarchs of Naples
Louis 3
House of Valois-Anjou
Dukes of Anjou
Louis 3
Counts of Provence
Counts of Forcalquier
Counts of Piedmont
Deaths from malaria
People of Byzantine descent
15th-century peers of France
Sons of kings